Žednik or Zednik may mean:

Places
 Stari Žednik, a village near Subotica, autonomous province of Vojvodina, Serbia; also a name in Croatian for this village
 Novi Žednik, a village near Subotica, autonomous province of Vojvodina, Serbia

People
 Heinz Zednik (born 1940), Austrian operatic tenor
 Richard Zedník (born 1976), Slovak hockey player